The Sovereign Award for Outstanding Breeder is a  Canadian Thoroughbred horse racing honor created in 1975 by the Jockey Club of Canada. It is part of the Sovereign Awards program and is awarded annually to the top breeder whose horse(s) have competed in Thoroughbred races in Canada during the year.

The award's counterpart in the United States is the Eclipse Award for Outstanding Breeder.

Past winners: 
1975 : Bory Margolus
1976 : E. P. Taylor
1977 : Conn Smythe
1978 : J. Louis Levesque
1979 : Kinghaven Farms
1980 : Marvin W. Hamilton
1981 : Tom Webb
1982 : Kinghaven Farms
1983 : Russell Bennett
1984 : Frank Stronach
1985 : E. P. Taylor
1986 : Kinghaven Farms
1987 : Kinghaven Farms
1988 : Ernie Samuel
1989 : Kinghaven Farms
1990 : Kinghaven Farms
1991 : Ernie Samuel
1992 : Steve Stavro
1993 : Kinghaven Farms
1994 : Kinghaven Farms
1995 : Kinghaven Farms
1996 : Minshall Farms
1997 : Frank Stronach
1998 : Frank Stronach
1999 : Frank Stronach
2000 : Sam-Son Farm
2001 : Sam-Son Farm
2002 : Sam-Son Farm
2003 : Sam-Son Farm
2004 : Sam-Son Farm
2005 : Adena Springs
2006 : Adena Springs
2007 : Adena Springs
2008 : Adena Springs
2009 : Eugene Melnyk
2010 : Adena Springs
2011 : Gardiner Farms Limited
2012 : William D Graham
2013 : Sam-Son Farm
2014 : Sam-Son Farm
2015 : Adena Springs
2016 : Adena Springs
2017 : Adena Springs
2018 : Tall Oaks Farm
2019 : Sam-Son Farm
2020 : Tall Oaks Farm

References
The Sovereign Awards at the Jockey Club of Canada website

Canadian racehorse owners and breeders
Horse racing awards
Horse racing in Canada